Lotte Nogler (born 27 February 1947, in Tscherms) is an Italian former alpine skier who competed in the 1968 Winter Olympics.

External links
 sports-reference.com

1947 births
Living people
Italian female alpine skiers
Olympic alpine skiers of Italy
Alpine skiers at the 1968 Winter Olympics
People from Tscherms
Germanophone Italian people
Sportspeople from Südtirol
20th-century Italian people